Blidari may refer to several villages in Romania:

 Blidari, a village in Căiuți Commune, Bacău County
 Blidari, a village in Cobia Commune, Dâmboviţa County
 Blidari, a village in Bălănești, Gorj
 Blidari, a village in Baia Mare city, Maramureș County
 Blidari, a village in Golești, Vâlcea
 Blidari, a village in Cârligele Commune, Vrancea County
 Blidari, a village in Dumitrești Commune, Vrancea County